, provisional designation , is a trans-Neptunian object from the scattered disc in the outermost Solar System, approximately  in diameter. It was discovered on 9 May 2010 by astronomers with the Pan-STARRS-1 survey at the Haleakala Observatory, Hawaii, in the United States. According to American astronomer Michael Brown, it is "possibly" a dwarf planet.

Orbit and classification 

 orbits the Sun at a distance of 46.0–80.2 AU once every 500 years and 11 months (182,969 days; semi-major axis of 63.07 AU). Its orbit has an eccentricity of 0.27 and an inclination of 20° with respect to the ecliptic.

This distant minor planet is a trans-Neptunian object and a member of the scattered disc population. Scattered-disc objects are thought to have been ejected from the classical Kuiper belt into their current orbits by gravitational interactions with Neptune, and typically have highly eccentric orbits and perihelia of less than 38 AU.

 has also been considered a detached object, since its relatively low eccentricity of 0.27, and its perihelion distance of 46.0 AU are hard to reconcile with the celestial mechanics of a scattered-disc object.
This has led to some uncertainty as to the current theoretical understanding of the outermost Solar System. The theories include close stellar passages, unseen planet/rogue planets/planetary embryos in the early Kuiper belt, and resonance interaction with an outward-migrating Neptune. The Kozai mechanism is capable of transferring orbital eccentricity to a higher inclination.

References

External links 
 
 

533560
533560
533560
20100509